The Association of Arctic Expedition Cruise Operators (AECO) is a voluntary cooperative organization of cruise lines largely working in the European arctic, including Greenland and Svalbard.  AECO establishes guidelines for its members that cover passenger safety, environmental protection issues and ethical interactions with indigenous populations.

See also
 International Association of Antarctica Tour Operators

References

External links
 

Traveling business organizations
Business organisations based in Norway
Organisations based in Longyearbyen